The National Changhua University of Education (NCUE) is a normal university in Changhua City, Changhua County, Taiwan.

The university offers a variety of undergraduate and graduate programs in education, liberal arts, science, engineering, and management.

It also has a Center for Teacher Education and Professional Development, which is responsible for training and certifying future teachers.

History
NCUE was initially established in 1745 as Baisha Academy.

In August 1971, it was renamed to Taiwan Provincial College of Education. In 1980, it was renamed to National Taiwan College of Education. In August 1989, it was renamed again to become National Changhua University of Education.

Academic Rankings

Campus
NCUE has two campuses, Jin-De and Bao-Shan, both located in Changhua.

Organization
NCUE comprises seven colleges: Arts, Education, Engineering, Management, Science, Sports, and Technology and Vocational Education.

Transportation
The university is accessible east of Changhua Station of the Taiwan Railway Administration.

Gallery

See also

 List of universities in Taiwan
Education in Taiwan

References

External links

 

1971 establishments in Taiwan
Changhua City
Educational institutions established in 1971
Technical universities and colleges in Taiwan
Teachers colleges
Universities and colleges in Changhua County